Seo Hyun-sook (born 6 January 1992) is a South Korean footballer who plays for Seoul WFC as a defender. She has been a member of the South Korea women's national team.

References

1992 births
Living people
South Korean women's footballers
Women's association football defenders
South Korea women's under-17 international footballers
South Korea women's under-20 international footballers
South Korea women's international footballers
WK League players